The Ontario Civilian Police Commission (OCPC; French: Commission civile de l’Ontario sur la police), previously known as the Ontario Police Commission and the Ontario Civilian Commission on Police Services, is an independent quasi-judicial agency, and is one of the 13 adjudicative tribunals overseen by the Ministry of the Attorney General that make up Tribunals Ontario. The OCPC hears appeals, adjudicates applications, conducts investigations and resolves disputes regarding the oversight and provision of policing services in Ontario. 

The role and authority of OCPC is mandated under the Ontario Police Services Act and Interprovincial Policing Act. 

Until 1990, the Ontario Civilian Commission on Police Services Board of Inquiry was the civilian oversight of police services in Ontario after which the Special Investigations Unit took over the role.

Organization

The OCPC has two divisions: Adjudicative and Investigative. The divisions operate independently under one Registrar.

The Adjudicative division is led by the Associate Chair and primarily deals with appeals of disciplinary matters; proposals to amalgamate, reduce or abolish existing municipal police forces; budgetary disputes regarding police services; and other functions. The Investigative division is led by the Executive Chair and deals with investigations, inquiries and public complaints concerning the conduct of chiefs of police, police officers, special constables and police services boards.

Responsibilities
OCPC handles complaints involving police conduct that do not result in a serious injury or death in the province, or that have been sent to OCPC from local police agencies. All other cases are investigated by the Special Investigations Unit.

Requests for other types of services can also be made by the Provincial government. For example, in late May 2019, the Commission appointed a retired Toronto deputy chief, Mike Federico, as administrator to oversee the Durham Regional Police whose senior ranks were being investigated for alleged corruption and abuse of power. As of that time, none of the allegations had been proven. The allegations were first brought to light in an April 19, 2019 report in the Toronto Star; at the time, a lawyer representing Chief Paul Martin said the allegations are "false and defamatory".

References

External links

Civilian regulating boards
Ontario government departments and agencies
Police oversight organizations